El ministro y yo is a 1976 Mexican film directed by Miguel M. Delgado and starring Cantinflas, Chela Castro, Lucía Méndez and Ángel Garasa. It is the last film in which Cantinflas acted alongside Garasa.

Plot
Mateo Melgarejo "Mateito" (Cantinflas) is a notary public and scribe for the illiterate people of Santo Domingo, a neighborhood north of Mexico City's Zócalo. A squatter friend asks for his help in negotiating with the land census bureau to regularize a land title. After a great deal of frustration with the government bureaucracy, he writes a letter to the cabinet minister, Don Antonio (Miguel Manzano), earning an audience with him. The minister is so pleased with Mateo's honesty that he hires him to reform the bureau. Mateo also ends up making friends with the minister's sister Vicky (Chela Castro) and the minister's daughter Bárbara (Lucía Méndez).

Mateo is initially appointed to work in the basement where the oldest archives of the offices are located, nicknamed "la ratonera" ("The Mousetrap"), alongside a kind elderly man, Avelino Romero, "Romeritos" (Ángel Garasa), but after the government official in charge of supervising the bureau (Raúl Padilla) realizes Mateo's connection with the minister, he places Mateo in charge of the bureau. However, after the minister is appointed as an ambassador overseas, Mateo is demoted again to the Mousetrap, this time alongside a younger, petulant employee (since Romeritos by then had retired). Mateo, tired of the multiple problems with his co-workers, resigns, but not before lecturing the officials on their duties in a democratic society. At the end, he returns to Santo Domingo to help its poor residents.

Cast
Cantinflas as Mateo Melgarejo "Mateíto"
Chela Castro as Vicky (as Celia Castro)
Lucía Méndez as Bárbara
Ángel Garasa as Avelino Romero "Romeritos"
Manolita Saval as Estrellita
Delia Peña Orta as María (as Niña Delia de la Peña)
Alonso Castaño as Don Nachito
Miguel Manzano as Don Antonio, minister
Daniel "Chino" Herrera as Guest from Yucatán
Raúl Padilla as Licenciado (as Raul Chato Padilla)
Tamara Garina as Tamarita
Alejandra Meyer as Julia Ramírez, Licenciado's secretary
José Manuel Fregoso
Pedro Damián (as Pedro Muñoz Romero)
Judith Velasco as Anita
Pedro de Aguillón as Alcalino Buenrostro
Gastón Melo as Guest from Nuevo León
Mónica Prado as Office employee
Héctor Suárez as Office employee
Manuel Alvarado as Fat Man (uncredited)
Socorro Avelar as Lupita (uncredited)
Carmen del Valle as Office employee (uncredited)
Federico González as Complaint Department employee (uncredited)
Rojo Grau as Spindola Jr. (uncredited)
Cecilia Leger as Client (uncredited)
Inés Murillo as Chonita, maid (uncredited)
Rubén Márquez as Office employee (uncredited)
Fernando Pinkus as Bureaucrat (uncredited)
Marcelo Villamil as Office employee (uncredited)
Fernando Yapur as Butler (uncredited)

References

Bibliography
García Riera, Emilio. Historia documental del cine mexicano: 1974–1976. Universidad de Guadalajara, 1992.

External links

1976 comedy films
1976 films
Mexican comedy films
Films directed by Miguel M. Delgado
1970s Mexican films